Rudel Alessandro Calero Nicaragua (born December 20, 1982) is a Nicaraguan footballer who currently plays for Real Estelí and the Nicaragua national football team.

Club career
Born in Bluefields, he made his debut for Deportivo Bluefields and played for América before enjoying a lengthy spell with Nicaraguan giants Real Estelí. He was Estelí´s top goalscorer in the 2005 Clausura and Apertura with 11 and 16 goals respectively but after scoring only 7 in the 2007 Apertura he was relegated to the bench only for Bluefield to try to lure him back to the club.

Controversy
In September 2010, Calero was charged with assault of a young man, the son of a prominent Nicaraguan businessman. Calero claimed the boy swore at him. He already faced prosecution for damage to property, after damaging a vehicle. The ill-disciplined Calero was again arrested in July 2012 after assaulting a citizen and allegedly threatening him with death.

International career
Calero made his debut for Nicaragua in an April 2001 friendly match against Belize and has, as of December 2013, earned a total of 26 caps, scoring 4 goals. He has represented his country in 2 FIFA World Cup qualification matches and played at the 2001, 2003, 2005 and 2011 UNCAF Nations Cups as well as at the 2009 CONCACAF Gold Cup.

His final international was a January 2011 Copa Centroamericana match against Guatemala.

International goals
Scores and results list Honduras' goal tally first.

References

External links

1982 births
Living people
People from Bluefields
Association football forwards
Nicaraguan men's footballers
Nicaragua international footballers
2001 UNCAF Nations Cup players
2003 UNCAF Nations Cup players
2005 UNCAF Nations Cup players
2009 CONCACAF Gold Cup players
2011 Copa Centroamericana players
Real Estelí F.C. players